"Eucosma" chlorosticha is a species of moth of the family Tortricidae. It is found in Liaoning, China.

References

Moths described in 1934
Eucosmini